Guide to the Good Life is a weekly Australian television series that airs on Channel Seven.

The series, sponsored by insurance company APIA, features various lifestyle segments including food, travel, motoring, home and finance advice. The program is aimed towards older viewers, the same demographic targeted by APIA.

The program premiered at 5pm on Saturday, 6 June 2009. It joins similar Seven programs such as Mercurio's Menu, Coxy's Big Break and Sydney Weekender, which are also shown on weekend afternoons between 5pm and 6pm.

The program is made in 1080i 25PsF high-definition.

Presenters
The presenters of Guide to the Good Life include:
 Andrew Gaze, former Olympic basketball player and current commentator for Seven Sport
 Mark Skaife, former V8 Supercar driver and current commentator for Seven Sport
 Steve Snow, chef
 Gorgi Quill, former news reporter and singer
 Max Walker, former test cricketer and writer
 Colette Mann, entertainer
 Sofie Formica, host of The Great South East

References

External links
 Official website

Seven Network original programming
2009 Australian television series debuts
Australian non-fiction television series